Ján Kermiet (born 16 March 1963 in Liptovský Mikuláš) is a Slovak sport shooter. He competed at the 1988 Summer Olympics in the men's 50 metre running target event, in which he placed fourth.

References

1963 births
Living people
Sportspeople from Liptovský Mikuláš
Running target shooters
Slovak male sport shooters
Shooters at the 1988 Summer Olympics
Olympic shooters of Czechoslovakia